Mabel Matiz is Turkish pop and rock singer Mabel Matiz's first studio album, which was released on 11 May 2011 in Turkey. Album was published in Turkey.

Track listing

References

External links 
 

Mabel Matiz albums
2011 albums